Sydney John Philip Easterbrook (22 January 1905 – 30 January 1975) was an English professional golfer. He won the Irish Open in 1934 and was a member of the Great Britain Ryder Cup team in 1931 and 1933. In 1933, he won the deciding match for Great Britain by beating Denny Shute on the final hole.

Syd had two brothers, Algy (1899–1960) and Cyril (1901–1975) who were also golfers.

Professional wins
This list may be incomplete
1934 Irish Open, Dunlop-West of England Tournament
1939 West of England Professional Championship

Results in major championships

Note: Easterbrook only played in The U.S. Open and The Open Championship.

WD = withdrew
CUT = missed the half-way cut
"T" indicates a tie for a place

Team appearances
Ryder Cup (representing Great Britain): 1931, 1933 (winners)
Seniors vs Juniors (representing the Juniors): 1928
England–Scotland Professional Match (representing England): 1932 (winners), 1933 (winners), 1934 (winners), 1935 (winners), 1938 (winners)
England–Ireland Professional Match (representing England): 1933 (winners)

References

English male golfers
Ryder Cup competitors for Europe
1905 births
1975 deaths